Sayyid Hassan Rasouli is an Iranian reformist politician who is currently a member of the  City Council of Tehran. He served as a governor under President Mohammad Khatami.

Rasouli is considered close to Mohammad-Reza Aref, formerly serving as his spokesman and senior adviser, and member of the 'Reformists' Supreme Council for Policymaking'.

References

Living people
Iranian governors
Members of the Reformists' Supreme Council for Policymaking
Tehran Councillors 2017–
Governors of Lorestan Province
Year of birth missing (living people)